George W. Johnson (December 22, 1894 – June 20, 1974) was a Minnesota  politician, the 28th Mayor of Duluth, Minnesota, and a former member and Speaker of the Minnesota House of Representatives.

A Republican, Johnson was elected to the Minnesota House of Representatives in 1924, representing the old District 59, which included portions of St. Louis County. He caucused with the Conservative Caucus in the then-nonpartisan body. In 1935, his peers elected him Speaker, a position he held for two years. Johnson was elected mayor of Duluth in 1944. He was re-elected in 1948 and served until January 1953.

See also
List of mayors of Duluth, Minnesota

References

External links

1894 births
1974 deaths
Mayors of Duluth, Minnesota
Republican Party members of the Minnesota House of Representatives
Speakers of the Minnesota House of Representatives
20th-century American politicians